The Pierre River is a tributary of the Mitchinamecus River which is a tributary of the rivière du Lièvre, flowing in the unorganized territory of Baie-Obaoca, in the Matawinie Regional County Municipality, in the administrative region of Lanaudière, in the province of Quebec, in Canada.

The Pierre river flows entirely in the forest zone. From the middle of 19th century, forestry was the dominant economic activity in the sector; recreational tourism, second.

The lower part of this small valley is served by the Chemin de Parent.

The river surface is generally frozen from mid-November to the end of April. Safe circulation on the ice is generally done from the end of December to the beginning of March. The water level of the river varies with the seasons and the precipitation.

Geography 

The watersheds neighboring the Pierre River are:
 north side: Mitchinamecus River;
 east side: Lac de la Souris, lac Pothole;
 south side: Lake Wagwabika, Lake Nemiscachingue, Lake Pothole;
 west side: long lake, Mitchinamecus River.

Lake Pierre () constitutes the head water of the Pierre river. It includes several marsh areas, especially on the south side and at the ends. It is supplied from the north by two lake outlets, four streams, as well as the outlet of eight lakes; and on the south side by the outlet (which empties into Sandy Bay, located at the far east of the lake) from seven lakes. Its mouth is located on the north shore of the western part of the lake.

  to the west by collecting the outlet (coming from the north) from Lac Paul, to the outlet (coming from the south) from Clair and Green lakes;
  towards the north, bending towards the west at the end of the segment to go and cut the Chemin de Parent (north–south direction), to its mouth.

The Pierre river flows on the east bank of the Mitchinamecus River, in the southern part of Lac Long which is formed by a widening of the river.

Toponymy 
The toponym "Rivière Pierre" was formalized on January 24, 1992 at the Place Names Bank of the Commission de toponymie du Québec.

Notes and references

Appendices

Related articles 
 Matawinie Regional County Municipality
 Baie-Obaoca, a TNO
 Mitchinamecus River
 Rivière du Lièvre, a stream
 Ottawa River, a stream
 Mitchinamecus Reservoir, a body of water
 List of rivers of Quebec

External links 

Rivers of Lanaudière